Simon Schwartz or Schwarz may refer to:

Simon Schwarz, Austrian actor
Simon Schwartz (artist), German illustrator and cartoonist
 Simon Schwartz, a partner in the American  architectural firm Schwartz & Gross